Guitar God is the first album recorded by Randy Holden, after a hiatus from music for two decades.  The last album he recorded, prior to his departure from the music world, was Population II, in 1970. The Population II album became a much sought after, difficult to find collector's album, with prices upward of $900 being paid to get one.

Guitar God was recorded in 1993 in a limited release by the artist in 1997 through Captain Trip Records, a Japan-only label. Holden recorded with his former Blue Cheer bandmate, drummer Paul Whaley.  Prior to recording Guitar God, Holden and Whaley had not seen or spoken to each other for over two decades.

Guitar God received excellent reviews.

Track listing
Dark Eyes (Part I) 
Wild Fire 
Scarlet Rose 
Pain in My Heart 
Hell and High Water 
No Trace 
Got Love 
Blue My Mind 
Castle in the Sky 
Dark Eyes (Part II)

Personnel
Randy Holden - guitar, vocals 
Robert Bauer - Bass
Paul Whaley - Drums
Rachel Stavach - Vocals on "Hell and High Water" / "Pain in My Heart"

References

External links
http://www.randyholden.com/
http://guitargod.com/
http://guitargod.net/
https://web.archive.org/web/20120307224137/http://www.furious.com/perfect/randyholden.html
http://musicdish.com/mag/index.php3?id=3238
http://musicdish.com/mag/index.php3?id=5204
http://musicdish.com/mag/index.php3?id=10061

1997 albums